Sandy Islands may refer to the following geographical locations:
 Sandy Islands, a group of islands in Whitefish Bay, Lake Superior, Canada
 Sandy Islands, a group of islands in the northern basin of Lake Winnipeg in Manitoba, Canada
 Sandy Islands, a group of islands in Newfoundland and Labrador, Canada
 Sandy Islands, a group of islands in New Brunswick, Canada
 Sandy Islands, a group of islands in Saskatchewan, Canada